K136 or K-136 may refer to:

K-136 (Kansas highway), a state highway in Kansas
K-136 (1945–1985), a former state highway in Kansas 
K136 Kooryong, a South Korean rocket artillery system